The New Democratic Party of Ontario ran a full slate of 103 candidates in the 1999 provincial election.  Nine of these candidates were elected, making the party the third-largest in the Legislative Assembly of Ontario.  Some of these candidates have separate biography pages; information on others may be found here.

This page also includes information about New Democratic Party of Ontario candidates in by-elections held between 1999 and 2003.

Candidates

By-elections

References

1999